The 4th constituency of the Bas-Rhin is a French legislative constituency in the Bas-Rhin département.

Description

This constituency spreads west from Strasbourg and includes several small commuter towns such as Geispolsheim and Lingolsheim. It also contains Strasbourg International Airport within its borders.

The seat had been dominated by parties of the right throughout the 5th Republic until 2017, electing representatives from both Gaullist and non-Gaullist parties.

Historic representation

Election results

2022

 
 
|-
| colspan="8" bgcolor="#E9E9E9"|
|-
 

 
 
 
 
 

* Martine Wonner was the LREM candidate in the previous election. Her 2017 results are counted in the LREM scores for swing calculations.

2017

|- style="background-color:#E9E9E9;text-align:center;"
! colspan="2" rowspan="2" style="text-align:left;" | Candidate
! rowspan="2" colspan="2" style="text-align:left;" | Party
! colspan="2" | 1st round
! colspan="2" | 2nd round
|- style="background-color:#E9E9E9;text-align:center;"
! width="75" | Votes
! width="30" | %
! width="75" | Votes
! width="30" | %
|-
| style="background-color:" |
| style="text-align:left;" | Martine Wonner
| style="text-align:left;" | La République En Marche!
| LREM
| 
| 41.52
| 
| 55.86
|-
| style="background-color:" |
| style="text-align:left;" | Sophie Rohfritsch
| style="text-align:left;" | The Republicans
| LR
| 
| 23.75
| 
| 44.14
|-
| style="background-color:" |
| style="text-align:left;" | Thibault Manteaux
| style="text-align:left;" | National Front
| FN
| 
| 10.69
| colspan="2" style="text-align:left;" |
|-
| style="background-color:" |
| style="text-align:left;" | Albert Schwartz
| style="text-align:left;" | La France Insoumise
| FI
| 
| 7.03
| colspan="2" style="text-align:left;" |
|-
| style="background-color:" |
| style="text-align:left;" | Morgane Keck
| style="text-align:left;" | Regionalist
| REG
| 
| 4.36
| colspan="2" style="text-align:left;" |
|-
| style="background-color:" |
| style="text-align:left;" | Nathalie Palmier
| style="text-align:left;" | Ecologist
| ECO
| 
| 3.66
| colspan="2" style="text-align:left;" |
|-
| style="background-color:" |
| style="text-align:left;" | Jacques Cordonnier
| style="text-align:left;" | Far Right
| EXD
| 
| 2.26
| colspan="2" style="text-align:left;" |
|-
| style="background-color:" |
| style="text-align:left;" | Thibaut Vinci
| style="text-align:left;" | Radical Party of the Left
| PRG
| 
| 1.83
| colspan="2" style="text-align:left;" |
|-
| style="background-color:" |
| style="text-align:left;" | Michèle Tremolieres
| style="text-align:left;" | Ecologist
| ECO
| 
| 1.46
| colspan="2" style="text-align:left;" |
|-
| style="background-color:" |
| style="text-align:left;" | Eric Mouy
| style="text-align:left;" | Debout la France
| DLF
| 
| 1.43
| colspan="2" style="text-align:left;" |
|-
| style="background-color:" |
| style="text-align:left;" | Alexandra Brasleret
| style="text-align:left;" | Independent
| DIV
| 
| 0.64
| colspan="2" style="text-align:left;" |
|-
| style="background-color:" |
| style="text-align:left;" | Yasmina Chadli
| style="text-align:left;" | Communist Party
| PCF
| 
| 0.52
| colspan="2" style="text-align:left;" |
|-
| style="background-color:" |
| style="text-align:left;" | Patrick Arbogast
| style="text-align:left;" | Independent
| DIV
| 
| 0.36
| colspan="2" style="text-align:left;" |
|-
| style="background-color:" |
| style="text-align:left;" | Marc Baud-Berthier
| style="text-align:left;" | Far Left
| EXG
| 
| 0.30
| colspan="2" style="text-align:left;" |
|-
| style="background-color:" |
| style="text-align:left;" | Mathieu Le Tallec
| style="text-align:left;" | Far Left
| EXG
| 
| 0.18
| colspan="2" style="text-align:left;" |
|-
| colspan="8" style="background-color:#E9E9E9;"|
|- style="font-weight:bold"
| colspan="4" style="text-align:left;" | Total
| 
| 100%
| 
| 100%
|-
| colspan="8" style="background-color:#E9E9E9;"|
|-
| colspan="4" style="text-align:left;" | Registered voters
| 
| style="background-color:#E9E9E9;"|
| 
| style="background-color:#E9E9E9;"|
|-
| colspan="4" style="text-align:left;" | Blank/Void ballots
| 
| 1.34%
| 
| 6.47%
|-
| colspan="4" style="text-align:left;" | Turnout
| 
| 49.40%
| 
| 42.13%
|-
| colspan="4" style="text-align:left;" | Abstentions
| 
| 50.60%
| 
| 57.87%
|-
| colspan="8" style="background-color:#E9E9E9;"|
|- style="font-weight:bold"
| colspan="6" style="text-align:left;" | Result
| colspan="2" style="background-color:" | LREM GAIN FROM LR
|}

2012

|- style="background-color:#E9E9E9;text-align:center;"
! colspan="2" rowspan="2" style="text-align:left;" | Candidate
! rowspan="2" colspan="2" style="text-align:left;" | Party
! colspan="2" | 1st round
! colspan="2" | 2nd round
|- style="background-color:#E9E9E9;text-align:center;"
! width="75" | Votes
! width="30" | %
! width="75" | Votes
! width="30" | %
|-
| style="background-color:" |
| style="text-align:left;" | Sophie Rohfritsch
| style="text-align:left;" | Union for a Presidential Majority
| UMP
| 
| 43.94
| 
| 65.05
|-
| style="background-color:" |
| style="text-align:left;" | Nadine Soccio
| style="text-align:left;" | Socialist Party
| PS
| 
| 23.31
| 
| 34.95
|-
| style="background-color:" |
| style="text-align:left;" | Pascale Elles
| style="text-align:left;" | National Front
| FN
| 
| 15.99
| colspan="2" style="text-align:left;" |
|-
| style="background-color:" |
| style="text-align:left;" | Luc Huber
| style="text-align:left;" | Europe Ecology - The Greens
| EELV
| 
| 4.70
| colspan="2" style="text-align:left;" |
|-
| style="background-color:" |
| style="text-align:left;" | Danielle Meyer-Traber
| style="text-align:left;" | Centrist Alliance
| AC
| 
| 3.02
| colspan="2" style="text-align:left;" |
|-
| style="background-color:" |
| style="text-align:left;" | Julien Ratcliffe
| style="text-align:left;" | Left Front
| FG
| 
| 2.24
| colspan="2" style="text-align:left;" |
|-
| style="background-color:" |
| style="text-align:left;" | Frédéric Le Jehan
| style="text-align:left;" | The Centre for France
| CEN
| 
| 1.64
| colspan="2" style="text-align:left;" |
|-
| style="background-color:" |
| style="text-align:left;" | Jacques Barthel
| style="text-align:left;" | Miscellaneous Right
| DVD
| 
| 1.28
| colspan="2" style="text-align:left;" |
|-
| style="background-color:" |
| style="text-align:left;" | Agnès Hirzel
| style="text-align:left;" | Ecologist
| ECO
| 
| 1.18
| colspan="2" style="text-align:left;" |
|-
| style="background-color:" |
| style="text-align:left;" | Emmanuel Leroy
| style="text-align:left;" | Other
| AUT
| 
| 0.79
| colspan="2" style="text-align:left;" |
|-
| style="background-color:" |
| style="text-align:left;" | Jean-Philippe Martin
| style="text-align:left;" | Ecologist
| ECO
| 
| 0.68
| colspan="2" style="text-align:left;" |
|-
| style="background-color:" |
| style="text-align:left;" | Marie Gabrielle Lucas
| style="text-align:left;" | Miscellaneous Right
| DVD
| 
| 0.63
| colspan="2" style="text-align:left;" |
|-
| style="background-color:" |
| style="text-align:left;" | Valérie Acker
| style="text-align:left;" | Far Left
| EXG
| 
| 0.34
| colspan="2" style="text-align:left;" |
|-
| style="background-color:" |
| style="text-align:left;" | Marc Baud-Berthier
| style="text-align:left;" | Far Left
| EXG
| 
| 0.26
| colspan="2" style="text-align:left;" |
|-
| colspan="8" style="background-color:#E9E9E9;"|
|- style="font-weight:bold"
| colspan="4" style="text-align:left;" | Total
| 
| 100%
| 
| 100%
|-
| colspan="8" style="background-color:#E9E9E9;"|
|-
| colspan="4" style="text-align:left;" | Registered voters
| 
| style="background-color:#E9E9E9;"|
| 
| style="background-color:#E9E9E9;"|
|-
| colspan="4" style="text-align:left;" | Blank/Void ballots
| 
| 1.24%
| 
| 2.87%
|-
| colspan="4" style="text-align:left;" | Turnout
| 
| 56.25%
| 
| 51.31%
|-
| colspan="4" style="text-align:left;" | Abstentions
| 
| 43.75%
| 
| 48.69%
|-
| colspan="8" style="background-color:#E9E9E9;"|
|- style="font-weight:bold"
| colspan="6" style="text-align:left;" | Result
| colspan="2" style="background-color:" | UMP HOLD
|}

2007
Yves Bur was elected with more than 50% of the vote in the first round of voting, and therefore no second round took place.

|- style="background-color:#E9E9E9;text-align:center;"
! colspan="2" rowspan="2" style="text-align:left;" | Candidate
! rowspan="2" colspan="2" style="text-align:left;" | Party
! colspan="2" | 1st round
|- style="background-color:#E9E9E9;text-align:center;"
! width="75" | Votes
! width="30" | %
|-
| style="background-color:" |
| style="text-align:left;" | Yves Bur
| style="text-align:left;" | Union for a Presidential Majority
| UMP
| 
| 56.84
|-
| style="background-color:" |
| style="text-align:left;" | Claude Froehly
| style="text-align:left;" | Socialist Party
| PS
| 
| 15.75
|-
| style="background-color:" |
| style="text-align:left;" | Anne Meunier
| style="text-align:left;" | Democratic Movement
| MoDem
| 
| 11.13
|-
| style="background-color:" |
| style="text-align:left;" | Jacques Fernique
| style="text-align:left;" | The Greens
| LV
| 
| 5.23
|-
| style="background-color:" |
| style="text-align:left;" | Marie Madeline Heitz
| style="text-align:left;" | National Front
| FN
| 
| 5.06
|-
| style="background-color:" |
| style="text-align:left;" | Fabien Foesser
| style="text-align:left;" | Ecologist
| ECO
| 
| 1.79
|-
| style="background-color:" |
| style="text-align:left;" | Michel Oswald
| style="text-align:left;" | Far Left
| EXG
| 
| 1.45
|-
| style="background-color:" |
| style="text-align:left;" | Anthony Meckert
| style="text-align:left;" | Independent
| DIV
| 
| 0.86
|-
| style="background-color:" |
| style="text-align:left;" | Frédéric Lalande
| style="text-align:left;" | Far Right
| EXD
| 
| 0.72
|-
| style="background-color:" |
| style="text-align:left;" | Ariane Henry
| style="text-align:left;" | Communist Party
| PCF
| 
| 0.60
|-
| style="background-color:" |
| style="text-align:left;" | Marc Baud-Berthier
| style="text-align:left;" | Far Left
| EXG
| 
| 0.57
|-
| colspan="6" style="background-color:#E9E9E9;"|
|- style="font-weight:bold"
| colspan="4" style="text-align:left;" | Total
| 
| 100%
|-
| colspan="6" style="background-color:#E9E9E9;"|
|-
| colspan="4" style="text-align:left;" | Registered voters
| 
| style="background-color:#E9E9E9;"|
|-
| colspan="4" style="text-align:left;" | Blank/Void ballots
| 
| 1.47%
|-
| colspan="4" style="text-align:left;" | Turnout
| 
| 56.94%
|-
| colspan="4" style="text-align:left;" | Abstentions
| 
| 43.06%
|-
| colspan="6" style="background-color:#E9E9E9;"|
|- style="font-weight:bold"
| colspan="4" style="text-align:left;" | Result
| colspan="2" style="background-color:" | UMP HOLD
|}

2002
Yves Bur was elected with more than 50% of the vote in the first round of voting, and therefore no second round took place.

|- style="background-color:#E9E9E9;text-align:center;"
! colspan="2" rowspan="2" style="text-align:left;" | Candidate
! rowspan="2" colspan="2" style="text-align:left;" | Party
! colspan="2" | 1st round
|- style="background-color:#E9E9E9;text-align:center;"
! width="75" | Votes
! width="30" | %
|-
| style="background-color:" |
| style="text-align:left;" | Yves Bur
| style="text-align:left;" | Union for a Presidential Majority
| UMP
| 
| 57.48
|-
| style="background-color:" |
| style="text-align:left;" | Jacques Fernique
| style="text-align:left;" | The Greens
| LV
| 
| 19.35
|-
| style="background-color:" |
| style="text-align:left;" | Marilene Heitz
| style="text-align:left;" | National Front
| FN
| 
| 11.25
|-
| style="background-color:" |
| style="text-align:left;" | G. Pierre Noth
| style="text-align:left;" | National Republican Movement
| MNR
| 
| 4.90
|-
| style="background-color:" |
| style="text-align:left;" | Martine Charbonnel
| style="text-align:left;" | Ecologist
| ECO
| 
| 2.41
|-
| style="background-color:" |
| style="text-align:left;" | Jacqueline Berthon
| style="text-align:left;" | Republican Pole
| PR
| 
| 1.55
|-
| style="background-color:" |
| style="text-align:left;" | Claude Kugler
| style="text-align:left;" | Workers’ Struggle
| LO
| 
| 1.20
|-
| style="background-color:" |
| style="text-align:left;" | Rene Floureux
| style="text-align:left;" | Movement for France
| MPF
| 
| 0.84
|-
| style="background-color:" |
| style="text-align:left;" | M. Olivier Gebuhrer
| style="text-align:left;" | Communist Party
| PCF
| 
| 0.76
|-
| style="background-color:" |
| style="text-align:left;" | Karl Goscheschek
| style="text-align:left;" | Regionalist
| REG
| 
| 0.25
|-

| colspan="6" style="background-color:#E9E9E9;"|
|- style="font-weight:bold"
| colspan="4" style="text-align:left;" | Total
| 
| 100%
|-
| colspan="6" style="background-color:#E9E9E9;"|
|-
| colspan="4" style="text-align:left;" | Registered voters
| 
| style="background-color:#E9E9E9;"|
|-
| colspan="4" style="text-align:left;" | Blank/Void ballots
| 
| 1.56%
|-
| colspan="4" style="text-align:left;" | Turnout
| 
| 59.84%
|-
| colspan="4" style="text-align:left;" | Abstentions
| 
| 40.16%
|-
| colspan="6" style="background-color:#E9E9E9;"|
|- style="font-weight:bold"
| colspan="4" style="text-align:left;" | Result
| colspan="2" style="background-color:" | UMP GAIN FROM UDF
|}

Sources

4